Mike Kipruto Kigen (born 15 January 1986) is a Kenyan  long-distance runner. He specializes in the 5000 metres and 10,000 metres and won silver medals in both events at the African Championships in Athletics in 2006 representing Kenya. In October 2015, he changed his name to Kaan Kigen Özbilen and has since then competed for Turkey.

Career
Kigen was born in Keiyo District. He graduated in 2005 from the Simotwo High School in Ainabkoi, Keiyo South District where He was represented the school in various competitions. He is based at the PACE Sports Management training camp in Kaptagat.

Kigen's breakthrough year came in 2006 when he represented Kenya internationally at three competitions. He was fifth at the 2006 IAAF World Cross Country Championships – a placing that brought him a gold medal with the Kenyans in the team competition. He set a personal best of 12:58.58 in the 5000 metres at the Bislett Games in Oslo and became the national champion over the distance.

Track running
This earned him selection for the 2006 African Championships in Athletics in Bambous, where he scored a silver medal in his preferred distance before going on to win another silver through a personal best of 28:03.70 in the 10,000 metres event. He was not as successful at the 2006 IAAF World Athletics Final, taking seventh in the 5000 m, but his track form returned at the 2006 IAAF World Cup as he took his second 5000 m silver of the year representing Africa. His career was then disrupted at the end of the season by a severe knee injury in November.

He returned to competition in 2007, but it was in 2008 that he began to regain his form. He won the Great Capital Run in July 2008, recording a course record of 28:42 minutes. At the 2008 IAAF World Athletics Final he ran in the 3000 metres and took fourth place. The following year he attended the 2009 IAAF World Athletics Final (the last edition of the event) and was eleventh over 5000 m.

Focus on road and cross country
He started the 2010 cross country running season well, with win at the IAAF permit meeting Antrim International Cross Country and the Crosse Oeust-France. He followed this with another win at the San Sebastián Cross Country but he was not selected for the Kenyan team for the 2010 IAAF World Cross Country Championships. He set a best of 28:09 over 10 km at the Parelloop race in Brunssum in March, coming fourth behind Berhanu Delale. He ran at the Grand 10 Berlin in October and took second place in largely Kenyan affair, finishing with a new personal best of 27:25 for the 10K distance. He returned to the cross country circuit in November, taking third at both the Tuskys Cross Country meet in Kenya and Cross de l'Acier in France. He also won in Antrim the following January, retaining his title.

He was not included in the Kenyan World Cross Country squad and ran his half marathon debut instead at the Lisbon Half Marathon, coming fifth with a time of 1:00:49. Following this he was runner-up to Micah Kogo at the Parelloop in April. He competed on the 2011 IAAF Diamond League circuit, but did not finish higher than seventh place. He did, however, set a 10,000 m best of 27:30.53 minutes at the Memorial Van Damme. Kigen dipped under the hour mark for the first time at the Delhi Half Marathon, and his time of 59:58 minutes was just one second behind the winner Lelisa Desisa.

He began 2012 with his third straight win in Antrim and a second career victory at the Cross de San Sebastián. He came third at the Azkoitia-Azpeitia Half Marathon and second at the Würzburger Residenzlauf. He attempted to gain selection for the 2012 London Olympics, but finished tenth in the 10,000 m trial at the Prefontaine Classic and fifth in the Kenyan 5000 m trial. A personal best run of 27:03.49 minutes came at the Memorial Van Damme. His last outing of the year was a fourth-place finish at the Great North Run.

Kigen made his debut in the marathon in January 2013, coming eighth at the Dubai Marathon with a time of 2:08:24 hours.

In the 2014 Great North Run Kigen led much of the race, being passed by Mo Farah in the final 300m. Both athletes finished in 59:59.

Achievements

References

External links

The Standard, 12 August 2006: Silver gives Kigen self belief to beat Bekele

Living people
1986 births
People from Elgeyo-Marakwet County
Kenyan male long-distance runners
Kenyan male marathon runners
Kenyan male cross country runners
Turkish male long-distance runners
Turkish male marathon runners
Kenyan emigrants to Turkey
Naturalized citizens of Turkey
Olympic athletes of Turkey
Athletes (track and field) at the 2016 Summer Olympics
European Cross Country Championships winners
European Athletics Championships medalists
Athletes (track and field) at the 2018 Mediterranean Games
Mediterranean Games bronze medalists for Turkey
Mediterranean Games medalists in athletics
Olympic male marathon runners
20th-century Kenyan people
21st-century Kenyan people